Dapaong (also known as Dapaongo or Dapango) is a city in northern Togo and prefecture seat of Tône in the Savanes Region, of which it is also the capital. It had a population of 58,071 at the 2010 Census. It is situated 638 km north of the capital Lomé, near the border with Burkina Faso. It is a market town and has a small museum.

Economy
Dapaong plays a strategic role in the trade of West Africa because it occupies a privileged place for the transit of goods to Burkina Faso, Benin and Niger. The local economy is therefore one of the most important in Togo. The economic center of the city is the market with various shops which sell fabric, millet and sheep. The main sources of income are from craft manufacturing, trade and livestock, and agriculture (including cotton, millet, corn, tomato (dry season or against-season) and jatropha cultivation. Since the 2000s, the tomato cultivation has intensified around Dapaong exporting to Lome a significant amount of its production.

Infrastructure
Supplied with electricity from the Akosombo Dam, the city however faces major difficulties in water sanitation and public health.

Education
Dapaong has several public schools, including the High School, Nassablé. The authorities of Togo support students and gave them the opportunity to learn how to use computers after giving them 20 computers.

Demographics
Dapaong is populated predominantly by Moba, Gourma, Mossi and Fulani. The Roman Catholic Diocese of Dapaong is located in the city.

Notable people
 Djené Dakonam, footballer
 Adamou Kampatib Kankpe-Kombath, member of the Togolese Parliament, UNESCO Permanent Secretary, Director of the Togolese Office for the Education of Adults, member of the Dyiob moba clan, he died in 1985 in a tragic car accident. He was made nominated as a MONO knight (Chevalier de l'Ordre du Mono) and received the NOMA Prize from Unesco.

See also
Foadam Dapaong

References

Populated places in Savanes Region, Togo
Savanes Region, Togo